Shaannan or Southern Shaanxi refers to the portion of China's Shaanxi province south of the Qinling Mountains.  Its name derives from the province's abbreviation "Shaan" combined with the word "Nan" (lit. "south"), its geographical location within the province.

In the Yuan Dynasty, the area began to be merged with what is the Guanzhong Plain to form Shaanxi province. The Qinling Mountains, as a geographic barrier, has also created major differences in climate, cultural traditions and dialects between Shaannan and the other parts of Shaanxi, and thus there is some similarity between Shaannan and Sichuan.

Geography

The region is mountainous, and was historically part of the Bashu region.  It is geographically considered part of the Sichuan Basin's northern fringe and the three prefectural cities in the Shaannan region are mainly based along the valleys and drainage basins of the Han River's tributaries, all part of the Yangtze river system.  The only exception is the Luonan County in northern Shangluo, which is based around the upper Luo River and is part of the Yellow River system.

Cities
Hanzhong
Ankang
Shangluo

Culture
The Shaannan dialects belongs to the Northern Chinese group, and forms a transition between the Southwestern and Central Plains dialects.  For the most part, the native dialects of Shaannan are divided into the Qinlong and Guanzhong groups of the Central Plains dialect.  The Sichuanese group of the Southwestern dialect are mostly "guest dialects" brought in by large influx of migrants from Hubei, Hunan and northern Guangdong during the early Ming and early Qing dynasties.

Transportation

National Roads:
G108
G210
G312
G316

Expressways:
Xihan Expressway (Xi'an—Hanzhong)
Xikang Expressway (Xi'an—Ankang)

Railways:
Xi'an–Ankang Railway
Yangpingguan–Ankang Railway
Xiangyang–Chongqing Railway

See also
Shaanbei
Guanzhong

Regions of China
Geography of Shaanxi